Columbia Township is one of nine townships in Whitley County, Indiana, United States. As of the 2010 census, its population was 11,047 and it contained 4,799 housing units.

Geography
The streams of Blue Babe Branch, Blue River and Stony Creek run through this township.

Cities and towns
 Columbia City (vast majority)

Unincorporated towns
(This list is based on USGS data and may include former settlements.)

Adjacent townships
 Thorncreek Township (north)
 Union Township (east)
 Jefferson Township (southeast)
 Washington Township (south)
 Cleveland Township (southwest)
 Richland Township (west)

Cemeteries
The township contains five cemeteries: Bethel, Nolt, Oak Grove, Saint Peters and South Park.

Major highways
  U.S. Route 30
  Indiana State Road 9
  Indiana State Road 109
  Indiana State Road 205

References
 
 United States Census Bureau cartographic boundary files

External links
 Indiana Township Association
 United Township Association of Indiana

Townships in Whitley County, Indiana
Townships in Indiana